Joshua Ivan McLaurin (born January 17, 1988) is an American politician serving as a member of the Georgia State Senate in the state of Georgia. Before his election to the State Sentate, McLaurin served two terms in the Georgia House of Representatives.

Early life
McLaurin was born in Cobb County, Georgia. He attended the University of Georgia for college. He then attended Yale Law School, where he briefly lived with author and future U.S. Senator J.D. Vance.

Political career
After winning the 2018 election for a seat in the Georgia House of Representatives, McLaurin succeeded 17-year incumbent Wendell Willard.

In 2022, following Donald Trump's endorsement of J. D. Vance for that year's Senate election in Ohio, McLaurin shared messages Vance had sent him during the 2016 presidential campaign saying that Trump could possibly become "America's Hitler".

References

External links

Democratic Party members of the Georgia House of Representatives
1988 births
Living people
University of Georgia alumni
Yale Law School alumni
People from Sandy Springs, Georgia
21st-century American politicians